The 2014 Northern Kentucky River Monsters season was the second and final season for the Continental Indoor Football League (CIFL) franchise.

After a two-year layoff, the River Monsters announced that they would be returning to an active team, joining the Continental Indoor Football League for the 2014 season. Head coach Brian Schmidt was fired on February 22, and was replaced by defensive coordinator Mike Goodpaster. Goodpaster was able to salvage the season after losing quarterback Jared Lorenzen to injury in Week 2, going 5–2 down the stretch, defeating the Dayton Sharks the final week of the season to clinch the final South Division playoff spot.

Schedule

Regular season

Standings

Postseason

Final roster

References

Northern Kentucky River Monsters
2014 Continental Indoor Football League season
Northern Kentucky River Monsters